Albert Černý (born 17 February 1989 in Třinec) is a Czech-Polish singer and guitarist. He is known as the lead singer of Charlie Straight and Lake Malawi.

Personal life
He graduated from a Polish elementary school and Czech high school in Třinec. Afterwards he graduated with a degree in English translation at Palacký University in Olomouc. Černý is of Polish nationality.

Eurovision Song Contest
In 2019, he represented Czech Republic at the Eurovision Song Contest 2019 held in Tel Aviv, Israel as part of Lake Malawi. They performed the song "Friend of a Friend" and finished in 11th place with 157 points.

In January 2020, it was revealed that Černý would take part in Poland's Eurovision selection. He qualified to the final and placed second with the song “Lucy”.

References 

21st-century Czech male singers
Czech guitarists
Male guitarists
Czech people of Polish descent
1989 births
Living people
Musicians from Třinec
Palacký University Olomouc alumni
Polish people from Zaolzie
Eurovision commentators